Park Sang-hong (born March 29, 1989) is a South Korean cyclist, who currently rides for UCI Continental team .

Major results
Source: 

2015
 1st  Road race, National Road Championships
2016
 4th Road race, Asian Road Championships
2017
 1st  Road race, Asian Road Championships
 Tour de Filipinas
1st Points classification
1st Stage 4
 5th Overall Tour de Molvccas
2019
 2nd  Team time trial, Asian Road Championships
 8th Overall Tour de Tochigi
2020
 1st  Road race, National Road Championships
 3rd Team pursuit, National Track Championships
2021
 8th Overall Tour of Thailand

References

External links
 
 
 

1989 births
Living people
South Korean male cyclists
Sportspeople from North Jeolla Province
20th-century South Korean people
21st-century South Korean people